Boulder Magazine is a glossy four-color publication that has covered the city and county of Boulder, Colorado since 1978. The founder and publisher is Tom Brock. The editor is Mary Jarrett. Boulder Magazine focuses on local events, the arts, sports, business, science, health, politics, history, dining and nightlife. It is published by Brock Media Corp./Brock Publishing Corp. three times a year: on Memorial Day (summer issue), Labor Day (fall issue) and Thanksgiving (winter/spring Issue).

External links
Boulder Magazine
Brock Publishing

Culture of Boulder, Colorado